Tyrosine-protein phosphatase non-receptor type 9 is an enzyme that in humans is encoded by the PTPN9 gene.

Function 

The protein encoded by this gene is a member of the protein tyrosine phosphatase (PTP) family. PTPs are known to be signaling molecules that regulate a variety of cellular processes including cell growth, differentiation, mitotic cycle, and oncogenic transformation. This PTP contains an N-terminal domain that shares a significant similarity with yeast SEC14, which is a protein that has phosphatidylinositol transfer activity and is required for protein secretion through the Golgi complex in yeast. This PTP was found to be activated by poly-phosphoinositide, and is thought to be involved in signaling events regulating phagocytosis.

References

Further reading

External links 
 PDBe-KB provides an overview of all the structure information available in the PDB for Human Tyrosine-protein phosphatase non-receptor type 9 (PTPN9)